The Joan Sims filmography lists the film and television appearances of the English actress Joan Sims (1930–2001).

Filmography

Film

Television

Video games

External links
 

Actress filmographies
British filmographies